The MarketPlace Limited is a grocery store chain in Bermuda.

History 
The chain was founded by the Crisson Family in 1939, and was originally called Piggly Wiggly Limited, with each store having the name "Piggly Wiggly." In 1946 the company was purchased by the Pimental Family, and in 1950 was purchased by Mr. Fernance Perry.

In March 1979 Alvin Ferreira purchased the operations of the Piggly Wiggly Limited chain; since he already operated another store, the Modern Mart, the Piggly Wiggly Limited chain was expanded to five stores. In 1981, the chain was renamed The MarketPlace Ltd., with the five stores following suit.

In 1987 the chain acquired the A-1 Paget and A-1 Smith stores, so the chain now had seven stores. In 1994 the chain acquired the Shopping Centre Limited grocery store.

Activities 
 the chain had eight locations. The corporate headquarters is located within the chain's Hamilton MarketPlace location, the largest grocery store in Bermuda.

References

External links

 The MarketPlace

Retail companies of Bermuda
1939 establishments in Bermuda
Supermarkets of North America
Retail companies established in 1939
Bermuda in World War II